Chandrapur Municipality (other names Chandranigahapur, locally known as Chapur) is a Municipality in Rautahat District in the Narayani Zone in Madhesh Province of southern Nepal. The municipality was established on 18 May 2014 by merging Chandranigahapur, Judibela, Paurai, Santpur Matioun, Dumariya Matioun VDCs.

At the time of the 1991 Nepal census it had a population of 13,456 people living in 2,465 individual households.

History 

This town was named under the late Rana Prime Minister Chandra Shamsher, who used to come for hunting purpose. People started to live here after the naming of this place.

Development activities 
In remembrance of Girija Prasad Koirala. The head of Rautahat Branch's G.P Koirala Study Centre shailendra prasad Gupta does the construction of Dabari where Tourism Area has begun. Cha.pur Hospital, Janata samudayik Hospital, Chandranigahapur Hospital, Road Development, etc. have also commenced.

Banks in Chandrapur include Siddhartha Bank Limited, Nepal SBI, Nepal  Bank, NCC Bank, Everest Bank, Jyoti bikash Bank, Laxmi Development Bank, Prabhu Bank, Machhapuchhre Bank.

There is also a picnic spot as well tourist place called "sahid smiriti park" near the bank of Chandi River. At the centre of the park is a list of names of people in stone script, who contributed their life during the 10 years of revolution (51/52-62/63). It is the major picnic spot for the locals.

Sports 
In this town many sports like volleyball, football and cricket is played. Rautahat Women Football team is the best women team over Nepal and also known for the power house of women football in Nepal. Late Sher Bahadur Darlami Magar and Nepal Karki of Chandranigahapur should be credited for women soccer accomplishment in Rautahat. Nepal Karki the present president of province 2 football association shall be credited for the Nepal's first women's football academy in Chandranigahapur.Their (late Sher Bahadur Darlami and Nepal karki) dedication and effort in the field of Football is unmatched by anyone in Nepal. Nepal's first women's football academy is there in present Chandrapur.Besides this martial arts like karate, wrestling  taekwondo etc. is practiced.

Media 
Chandrapur has two FM radio stations.
 Radio Nunthar F.M. - 102.6 MHz which is a community radio Station.
 Gunjan fm -105.3 MHz is another FM station in Chandranigahpur.

Developing places 
Many of the places are considered to be developed in local context; whereas, some are considered to be ongoing developing places. Some of them are Judibela, Basantapur, Santapur, Nayabasti, Dumariya, Balchanpur, Banbahuary, etc.

References 

Populated places in Rautahat District
Nepal municipalities established in 2014
Municipalities in Madhesh Province